James Bunning may refer to:

 Jim Bunning (1931–2017), American baseball pitcher and politician 
 James Bunstone Bunning (1802–1863), British architect